Joniawas Gurugram (or  Joniawas) is a village in Gurgaon district, Pataudi, Haryana, India. It is 25.1 km from Gurugram on the Farrukhnagar-Jhajjar Road adjacent Farukhnagar.

Education
It has a government school and a private school.

Demographics of 2019
As of 2019 India census, Joniawas had a population of 2397 in 623 households. Males (1247) constitute 51.19%  of the population and females (1150) 48.8%. Joniawas has an average literacy (1989) rate of 83%, upper than the national average of 74%: Total voter in village 1793 male voter 940 and female voter 853.

Facilities
Joniawas has a Government Senior Secondary School, a primary school and Big Cricket Ground. There are also temples dedicated to Lord Khatu Shayam Ji,  Lord Hanuman and  Lord Shiva

Adjacent villages

Farukhnagar 
Fazilpur
Tajnagar
Heli Mandi
Tirpari
Jamalpur
Khwaspur Babra
Basunda
Jataula

See also
 Joniawas (Joniawas) (on Farrukhnagar-Panchgaon road  from Farrukhnagar town in Gurugram District)

References 

Villages in Gurgaon district